Maywood station may refer to:

Maywood station (Illinois), a commuter rail station in suburban Chicago, Illinois
Maywood Station Museum, a museum and former railway station in Maywood, New Jersey